Portrait of Marguerite Gauthier-Lathuille or Young Woman in White is a c.1878 half-length oil on canvas portrait by Édouard Manet, now in the Musée des Beaux-Arts de Lyon, which acquired it in 1902. She never posed for the final work, which was instead based on sketches made by the artist. The painting was intended as a present for her father.

In the 1870s Manet regularly attended the cabaret run by the subject's father on avenue de Clichy in the Batignolles quarter of Paris, near the Café Guerbois, a hub for the Impressionists. In 1879 he showed him in the background of Chez le père Lathuille (Musée des Beaux-Arts de Tournai).

Sources
http://www.mba-lyon.fr/mba/sections/fr/collections-musee/peintures/oeuvres-peintures/xixe_siecle/marguerite-gauthier2169

Gauthier-Lathuille
Gauthier-Lathuille
Gauthier-Lathuille
1878 paintings
Paintings in the collection of the Museum of Fine Arts of Lyon